"Hold On" is a song by American rock band Alabama Shakes. The track was first released on February 6, 2012 in the United Kingdom as the lead single from the studio album Boys & Girls (2012).

Music video
A music video to accompany the release of "Hold On" was first released on YouTube on 30 March 2012. In this video, the song was performed live in a studio. As of November 2022, the video has over 49 million views.

Reception
"Hold On" received critical acclaim from music critics. Rolling Stone named it the best song of 2012. It was also voted the 11th best single of 2012 by The Village Voice's 40th annual Pazz & Jop poll.

NPR named "Hold On" the fifth best song by a woman or non-binary artist in the 21st century, saying of the song:"Despite her ability to quickly transition from a sultry croon à la Janis Joplin to a bellowing, often disembodied howl, it's the lyrical wisdom that masks Howard's young age and makes this song special. "Hold On" is not just a mantra offering the encouragement needed to get through life's rough patches; it's a timeless song that wouldn't work without Howard's ability to interweave a myriad of emotions with raw honesty"

Track listing

Charts

Year-end charts

Certifications

Release history

References

2012 debut singles
2012 songs
Alabama Shakes songs
Rough Trade Records singles
Songs written by Brittany Howard